The Consultants are a comedy sketch team who first reached public prominence in August 2002 where they won the Perrier Best Newcomer Award at the Edinburgh Fringe.

The team, consisting of Neil Edmond, Justin Edwards and James Rawlings, have since recorded four series of comedy shows, also named The Consultants, on BBC Radio 4, featuring an eclectic mix of songs, puns and sketches.

Series list

Series one

Series two

Series three

Series four

BBC Audiobooks Release
Released in 2003 (Cat no. 056352345x) which contains the first four episodes of the first series.

External links
The Consultants at radio 4

BBC Radio comedy programmes
2003 radio programme debuts
Comedy collectives
2002 establishments in the United Kingdom
2005 radio programme endings